Kurt Ebener (4 May 1920 – 7 May 1975) was a Luftwaffe fighter ace and recipient of the Knight's Cross of the Iron Cross during World War II. The Knight's Cross of the Iron Cross was awarded to recognise extreme battlefield bravery or successful military leadership. Kurt Ebener was credited with 57 victories in 150 missions, 52 over the Eastern Front.

Career
Ebener was born on 4 May 1920 in Könitz, present-day a municipality of Unterwellenborn, at the time in Thuringia of the Weimar Republic. He volutunteered for military service in the Luftwaffe on 17 November 1939. He was posted to 4. Staffel of Jagdgeschwader 3 "Udet" (JG 3—3rd Fighter Wing) based on the Eastern Front. On 23 May 1942 he scored his first two victories when he shot down two Russian Polikarpov I-16 fighters. Ebener reached his 10th victory on 30 July and his 20th on 17 December.

In December 1942, Ebener volunteered for the Platzschutzstaffel (airfield defence squadron) of the Pitomnik Airfield. The Staffel, largely made up from volunteers from I. and II. Gruppe of JG 3, was responsible for providing fighter escort to Junkers Ju 52 transport aircraft and Heinkel He 111 bombers shuttling supplies for the encircled German forces fighting in the Battle of Stalingrad. During four weeks he shot down 30 enemy aircraft. On 1 March 1943, he was transferred to Ergänzungs-Jagdgruppe Ost to undertake a period of instructing.

On 7 April 1943, Ebener was awarded the Knight's Cross of the Iron Cross for 52 aerial victories claimed. Simultaneously, he was promoted to the rank of Leutnant (second lieutenant).

Squadron leader
On 31 March 1944 he was transferred to 5. Staffel of Jagdgeschwader 11 (JG 11—11th Fighter Wing) and on 15 July, he was appointed the Staffelkapitän of 5. Staffel of JG  11 based on the invasion front in Normandy. In August Ebener shot down five USAAF fighters, including three P-47 Thunderbolts. He was shot down himself in a dogfight with USAAF fighters southeast of Paris while flying a Messerschmitt Bf 109 G-14 (Werknummer 780667—factory number) on 23 August 1944. Although saved by his parachute, he was badly wounded and become a prisoner of war. Due to his serious injuries he was repatriated to Germany in January 1945.

Kurt Ebener was credited with 57 victories in 150 missions, 52 over the Eastern Front, including 14 Il-2 Sturmoviks and five over the Western Front.

Summary of career

Aerial victory claims
According to US historian David T. Zabecki, Ebener was credited with 57 aerial victories. Obermaier also lists Ebener with 57 aerial victories, 52 on the Eastern Front and five over the Western Allies, claimed in approximately 150 combat missions. Mathews and Foreman, authors of Luftwaffe Aces — Biographies and Victory Claims, researched the German Federal Archives and found records for 51 aerial victories, all of which claimed on the Eastern Front.

Victory claims were logged to a map-reference (PQ = Planquadrat), for example "PQ 4911". These sectors were then subdivided into 36 smaller units to give a location area 3 × 4 km in size.

Awards
 Iron Cross (1939) 2nd and 1st Class
 Wound Badge in Black
 Front Flying Clasp of the Luftwaffe in Gold
 Honour Goblet of the Luftwaffe on 15 March 1943 as Feldwebel and pilot
 German Cross in Gold on 18 March 1943 as Feldwebel in the 4./Jagdgeschwader 3
 Knight's Cross of the Iron Cross on 7 April 1943 as Feldwebel and pilot in the 4./Jagdgeschwader 3 "Udet"

Notes

References

Citations

Bibliography

 
 
 
 
 
 
 
 
 
 
 
 
 

1920 births
1975 deaths
Luftwaffe pilots
German World War II flying aces
Recipients of the Knight's Cross of the Iron Cross
People from Saalfeld-Rudolstadt
Military personnel from Thuringia
Recipients of the Gold German Cross